Acorn Park is a  urban park in downtown Silver Spring, Maryland, which features an acorn-shaped gazebo and an artificial grotto. The site is historically significant as it is thought to be the location of the "mica-flecked spring" that in 1840 inspired Francis Preston Blair to name his estate "Silver Spring".

Acorn Park is located at the intersection of East-West Highway and Newell Street.

History
The gazebo in Acorn Park was constructed in 1842 by Benjamin C. King. Francis Blair's son-in-law, Samuel Phillips Lee, had the stone grotto built at the site of the spring in 1894. It originally included a statue of a Greek nymph. The park land was purchased by the Maryland-National Capital Park and Planning Commission in 1942 and was refurbished and rededicated in 1955.
A small additional tract of land was acquired by M-NCPPC in 1997, to make the current .

Gallery

References

External links

 
 Acorn Urban Park on the Parks and Trails Atlas of Montgomery County, Maryland

Downtown Silver Spring, Maryland
Parks in Montgomery County, Maryland